All-Union Communist Party (Bolsheviks), (Vsesoyuznaya Kommunystycheskaya partiya ВКП(б)) is a communist party operating in the former Soviet Union. ВКП(б) was formed in 1995, following a split from the All-Union Communist Party of Bolsheviks (1991) (VKPB). The First Secretary of the Central Committee of the party is Alexander Lapin.

The central publication of ВКП(б) is Bolshevistskaya Pravda.

References

Communist parties in Russia
Neo-Sovietism
Political parties established in 1995
Transnational political parties